Blessing Bethlehem is a charity fundraising initiative with the purpose of helping the persecuted Christians living in the city of Bethlehem and its surrounding areas. It was launched in September 2016 by the Center for Jewish-Christian Understanding and Cooperation (CJCUC), at the LifeLight Festival in Sioux Falls, South Dakota.

History

In September 2012, Ohr Torah Stone's Center for Jewish-Christian Understanding and Cooperation (CJCUC), in partnership with Pastor Steven Khoury of Holy Land Missions, launched a Food Voucher Program to help the local Christian community living in Bethlehem. CJCUC's Executive Director, David Nekrutman, began his dialogue with the local Christian Arab community in 2009 through the organization's Bible Study Program. 

Nekrutman learned of the Christian Arab community's struggle between their ethnicity and religion and he wanted to alleviate the number one issue  - poverty.

With initial funding from American Jewish donors, the Food Voucher program began by purchasing vouchers from the Rami Levy supermarket chain. In 2013, the International Christian Embassy of Jerusalem (ICEJ) joined the program. In 2016, the Food Voucher Program was renamed  "Blessing Bethlehem" and  officially launched at the LifeLight Music Festival in Sioux Falls, South Dakota.

References

External links

 
 
 
 
 
 
 

Charity fundraisers
Charities based in Georgia (U.S. state)
Foreign charities operating in Israel
Religious organizations established in 2016
Persecution of Christians
Bethlehem
Christianity in Israel
Christianity in the State of Palestine
Jewish charities based in the United States
Religious charities
Christian charities based in the United States
Christianity in Palestine (region)
Jewish charities based in Israel
Interfaith organizations
Christianity in the Middle East
Christianity in Bethlehem